Keerti Shiledar (1952 – 22 January 2022), sometimes spelled Kirti Shiledar, was an Indian singer of Hindustani classical music and an actress on Marathi musical stage. She presided over the  98th Akhil Bharatiya Marathi Natya Sammelan (All India Marathi drama convention) held in 2018.

Early life
Keerti Shiledar was born in 1952, as the daughter of Marathi stage actors Jayaram Shiledar and Jaymala Shiledar, who are credited with keeping the Marathi musical stage alive during the lean years for this genre during the period. She started her acting career at the age of 12 when she officially joined the Marathi Rangbhumi Natak Company of her parents and participated in various Marathi musicals. She received her training in Hindustani classical vocals by actor and musician Nilkanth Abhyankar.

Stage career
She performed in several Marathi musical dramas, including "Sangeet Swarsamradni", "Sangeet Kanhopatra", "Yayati Aani Devyani", "Sanshay Kallol", "Swaymvar", "Sangeet", "Saubhadra", "Mrutchha Katik", "Mandodari", and "Ekach Pyala".

Personal life and death
Keerti Shiledar died of kidney ailments in Pune, on 22 January 2022, at the age of 69.

References

External Links
 

1952 births
2022 deaths
20th-century Indian actresses
20th-century Indian singers
20th-century Indian women singers
21st-century Indian actresses
Indian stage actresses
Indian women classical singers
Marathi-language singers
Actresses in Marathi theatre
Indian musical theatre actresses
Hindustani musicians